Saint Ephigenia of Ethiopia or Iphigenia of Ethiopia, also called Iphigenia of Abyssinia (1st century), is a folk saint whose life is told in the Golden Legend as a virgin converted to Christianity and then consecrated to God by St. Matthew the Apostle, who was spreading the Gospel to the region of "Ethiopia," which in this case is understood to be located in the regions south of the Caspian Sea, either in one of the provinces of Mesopotamia (Assyria and Babylon), or in Ancient Armenia (Colchis).

Hagiographic life

According to the legend, Ephigenia was the daughter of Ethiopian King Egippus. She was dedicated to God by Saint Matthew the Apostle, who veiled her.

When Hirtacus succeeded the King, he promised the apostle half of his kingdom if he could persuade Ephigenia to marry him. Matthew thus invited the king to Mass the following Sunday where he explained that she was already espoused to the eternal King and thus could not be purloined by Hirtacus. The king thus sent a swordsman to kill Matthew who stood at the altar, making him a martyr.

Not having managed to bend Ephigenia to his will, Hirtacus tried to destroy her home with fire. However, the apostle appeared and warded the flames from the house, turning them upon the royal palace. The king's son was seized by the devil and the king himself contracted leprosy, eventually killing himself.

The people thus chose Ephigenia's brother as their king, who reigned for seventy years, leaving his kingdom to his son who filled Egypt with Christian churches.

Hagiographic sources and commemoration

Roman Catholic Church

Saint Ephigenia's feast day in the Roman Catholic Church, along with Saint Matthew's, is on September 21.

The oldest textual source of her Life seems to be the Legenda Aurea (Golden Legend, also known as the Historia Longobardica or Flos Sanctorum) of Italian chronicler Jacobus de Voragine, compiled around 1275 AD. This was an influential book on Renaissance spirituality and the understanding of sanctity which was read not only as a hagiography - a collection of lives of the saints - but as a vade mecum, a manual of asceticism. This is the manner in which Ignatius of Loyola employed it and how Teresa of Ávila advised her spiritual sisters that it should be used.

Saint Ephigenia is also listed in the hagiography of the Venetian Bishop Petrus de Natalibus (d. circa 1400), and appears in the 1586 edition of the Roman Martyrology of Cardinal Caesar Baronius, the first authoritative edition of the Roman Martyrology.

The Bollandists included an entry for Saint Iphigenia in their Acta Sanctorum for September 21. She is listed in a German language Bollandist-derived collection of saints of 1869. Professor Roberto Sánchez in his paper  'The Black Virgin: Santa Efigenia, Popular Religion, and the African Diaspora in Peru'  notes the following about the Bollandist account:

"The Bollandists, whose work is to historicize and contextualize the lives of the saints, concede that there is some doubt as to whether St. Matthew even went to Ethiopia. They conclude however that the legend is consistent with other sources and apocryphal writings of the period. It is clear that the story of Santa Efígenia is written as a corollary to the keen interest in the martyrdom of St. Matthew. His martyrdom is a significant historical event that has been subject of different versions. In effect, the origins of Santa Efigenia are shrouded in myth, folklore, and a spirited ecclesiastical historical debate."

The Austrian Jesuit missionary and author Francis Xavier Weninger (D.D., S.J.) included the life of Saint Ephigenia in his Lives of the Saints (1876), inscribed within the life of Saint Matthew on September 21:

"...Incontestible writings prove that he preached the Gospel for twenty-three years, partly in Ethiopia, partly in other countries, at the same time founding almost innumerable Churches, and supplying them with priests and bishops, in order to preserve the faith he had taught... ...Iphigenia, the eldest daughter of the newly converted king of Ethiopia, had not only become a Christian, but also, with the knowledge and consent of the holy Apostle, had consecrated her virginity to the Almighty, after having frequently heard the Saint preach on the priceless value of purity, and exhort others to guard and preserve it. Her example was followed by many other virgins, who, choosing the princess as their superior, lived together and occupied their time in prayer and work..."

Her listing in the Roman Martyrology (1916 English edition) states the following:

"In Ethiopia, St. Iphigenia, virgin, who being baptized and consecrated to God by the blessed apostle Matthew, ended her holy life in peace."

The Book of Saints (1921) compiled by the Benedictine Monks of St Augustine's Abbey, Ramsgate has the following entry for Saint Iphigenia:

"A Virgin converted to Christianity and afterwards consecrated to God by St. Matthew the Evangelist, Apostle of Ethiopia. The extant Acts of St. Matthew are however so untrustworthy that no reliance can be placed on the particulars given therein of St. Iphigenia and others of the first fruits of the Gospel in Ethiopia."

The Slaves of the Immaculate Heart of Mary also  recount the life of Saint Iphigenia:

"Saint Matthew, the Publican, preached the gospel in Ethiopia. He is, as Bartholomew for Armenia, an Apostle of a Nation, because, not only did he make many converts (as did all the Twelve) but he converted the king of Ethiopia by the stupendous miracle of raising the king’s daughter from the dead. Her name was Iphigenia and she is listed as a saint in the Martyrology. After her resurrection from the dead, with Saint Matthew’s approval, she took a vow of virginity. This so enraged the next king, Hirtacus, who wanted to marry her, that he had Matthew slain at the altar while offering Mass. The year was 68. Saint Matthew’s feast day is September 21."

Saint Ephigenia is also listed in Our Sunday Visitor's Encyclopedia of Saints (2014, 2nd edition):

"Iphigenia (d. first century). A virgin from Ethiopia who was converted by St. Matthew . No other reliable details about her are extant. Feast day: September 21."

Anglican Catholic Church

The Anglican Catholic Church records the memory of Saint Ephigenia, contained within the Life of Saint Matthew, citing The Anglican Breviary (1955):

"Although many parts of Christendom have delighted to claim this Apostle as the founder of their Churches, the usual tradition is that he went into the regions south of the Caspian Sea, (which same are in this instance called Ethiopia) where he preached the Gospel and confirmed the same by many wondrous deeds. The greatest of these is told on this wise: that he raised to life the king's daughter, Iphigenia, whereby the royal family was converted to Christ; that after the king died Hirtacus his successor demanded Iphigenia to wife; and that she (who through Matthew's teaching had vowed herself to God) rejected Hirtacus in pursuance of her vow; for which reason Matthew was by royal order put to death whilst celebrating the holy Mysteries, whereby he fulfilled his apostleship in martyrdom."

Eastern Orthodox Church

Significantly, the Life of Saint Matthew the Apostle in traditional Orthodox Synaxaria does not directly mention Saint Ephigenia by name, although the Synaxaria do record Saint Matthew's travels to "Ethiopia," that he enlightened the area, and was martyred there. The Orthodox Synaxarion according to the tradition of Nikephoros Kallistos Xanthopoulos (c. 1320), states that after being cruelly treated by the Parthians and Medes, St. Matthew then went to spread the Gospel to a certain city called "Mirmena / Myrmena," supposedly in Ethiopia, described as a land that was inhabited by tribes of cannibals:

"After departing from Jerusalem, the holy Apostle Matthew preached the glad tidings of the Gospel in many lands. Proclaiming the good news of Christ, he passed through Macedonia, Syria, Persia, Parthia and Media, establishing Churches there and in other places...He travelled all about Ethiopia, which had fallen to him by lot, and enlightened it with the light of the knowledge of the Gospel. Finally, guided by the Holy Spirit, he arrived in the land of the cannibals, who were a dark-skinned and savage people. There he entered a city known as Mirmena and, having converted several souls to Christ, he appointed Platon, his fellow traveller, to be their bishop, and built a little church...The wife and son of Fulvian, the price of that city, were possessed by demons...The apostle rebuked the unclean spirits and expelled them; and those who were healed fell down before the apostle and meekly followed after him..."

Be that as it may, a certain "Saint Iphigenia the Virgin-Martyr" is yet referenced in the Greek Orthodox calendar for November 16 (being the same feast day as Saint Matthew the Apostle in the Orthodox Church). Nowhere else is her memory referenced.

The Prologue from Ohrid compiled by Nikolai Velimirovic (1928) does not include St. Ephigenia, either on her own or within the life of Saint Matthew.

The Antiochian Orthodox Christian Archdiocese of North America does include St. Ephigenia of Ethiopia on its calendar of Saints, along with her traditional Latin biography, "commemorated on November 16 (also on September 21)". Similarly, Saints Mary and Martha Monastery in Wagener, South Carolina (OCA), does list St. Iphigenia, Princess of Ethiopia on the Western date of September 21, although the Orthodox Church in America's (OCA) online Synaxarion does not mention St. Iphigenia in its recollection of the Life of St. Matthew the Evangelist, including his period in Ethiopia.

Oriental Orthodox Churches

Saint Ephigenia of Ethiopia does not appear to be listed in either the Coptic Synaxarium or in the Ethiopian Synaxarium, either on her own, or within the life of Saint Matthew.

Historical veneration

Spain

The Carmelites of Cádiz, Andalusia, had a devotion to Santa Ifigênia. In Cádiz, African blacks organized their own religious association, the "Confradía de Nuestra Señora de la Salud, San Bello y Santa Ifigênia", formed in El Puerto de Santa María in 1575. From Cádiz, her devotion spread to Portugal and from there to Brazil.

Brazil

The Brazilian-born priest José Pereira de Santana devoted a definitive, two-volume work to Elesbaan and Ephigenia, published respectively in 1735 and 1738 at Lisbon. He considered them the two pillars of African sanctity and refashioned them as saints of his own Carmelite order. Elesbaan represented the triumph of Christianity over Judaism in the person of Dunaan, while Ephigenia stood for the early, voluntary acceptance of the Gospel in Africa.

A "Venerable Brotherhood of Saint Elesbão and Saint Efigênia" was founded in Rio de Janeiro on May 7, 1740, by free black slaves from Cape Verde, Coast of the Mine,  São Tomé Island, and Mozambique. The cult of those two Saints is believed to have been brought by the slaves themselves. Black brotherhoods in Roman Catholic societies in the New World relied upon a few black patron saints, including Santa Efigenia, Santo Antonio de Catagerona (d. 1549), and Sao Benedito (d. 1589).

Saint Iphigenia was also honored in joyous religious festivals and processions. According to Brazilian sociologist and anthropologist Gilberto Freyre, writing in 1922, "the festival of Saint Ephigenia, a sort of black Madonna, was enjoyed to the utmost by the colored folks, whose "consciousness of kind" was ably aroused by the priests."

On November 20, 1995 Brazilians observed the 300th anniversary of the death of Zumbi of Palmers, the last ruler of Palmares, regarded as one of the first freedom fighters of the Americas. In Belo Horizonte a procession of congados (pt) took place on the evening of November 23, 1996, honoring Nossa Senhora do Rosario, Saint Benedict the Moor, and Saint Iphigenia with processions of precision marching, singing, dancing and the use of percussion instruments. The combined reverence for the Catholic saints and the performance of African ritual elements are evidence of the co-existence of Catholic religious traditions and the preservation of an African cultural memory in Minas Gerais.

Peru

The diaspora of Santa Efígenia from Ethiopia to the Americas was part of the dispersal of African popular religious expressions that connected Africa, Europe, and the Americas.

A late twentieth century movement to gain national recognition of Afro-Peruvian cultural contributions in Cañete Province focused on Santa Efigenia, which included a statue and an eighteenth century wall-sized baroque painting of her by Peruvian artist Cristóbal Lozano. These artistic representations located in a private chapel on the hacienda La Quebrada in San Luis de Cañete were presented as legitimate artifacts of Santa Efigenia’s status as a folk or popular saint central to their construction of an Afro-Peruvian black identity and culture of devotion.

On August 20, 1994 Sabino Cañas, an Afro-Peruvian community leader, organized a small group of followers from the surrounding villages of Cañete and Chincha to establish the Santa Efigenia Association, and named her as Patroness of National Black Art, even as they struggled to craft a coherent historical narrative of Santa Efigenia’s origins. According to the Association’s popular history, Santa Efígenia has been at the hacienda of La Quebrada since approximately 1741.

An annual celebration of Santa Efígenia is held on September 21 each year, with processions made in homage to Santa Ifigenia in the district of San Luis de Canete. The Association produces a program flyer that introduces a brief history of the patron saint and focuses on her diffusion and popularity in Brazil, Cuba, and Peru. The festival has grown in popularity as the Afro-Peruvian community of artists, musicians, writers, sports figures, and admirers have converged on Cañete each September in growing numbers.

France

In honor of Saint Ephigenia, a virgin-martyr of 1794 had taken her name. A professed religious of the Order of St. Benedict that was martyred during the French Revolution in 1794 was known as "Sister Iphigénie of Saint Matthew". Her name was Blessed Marie-Gabrielle-Françoise-Suzanne de Gaillard de Lavaldène (1761–1794), also known as "Francesca Maria Susanna", "Sister Iphigénie of Saint Matthew" or "Ifigenia di San Matteo de Gaillard de la Valdène", and she was one of the Martyrs of Orange who was guillotined on 7 July 1794 in Orange, Vaucluse, France. She was beatified 10 May 1925 by Pope Pius XI and she is commemorated on July 7.

Churches

  Igreja de Santa Efigênia dos Pretos, Ouro Preto, Minas Gerais, Brazil, founded in 1785. According to tradition, the church of St. Ephigenia in Vila Rica was built largely from the proceeds of gold dust washed out of their hair by devout black women. The building of the Igreja Nossa Senhora Santa Efigênia no Alto Cruz (Our Lady of Saint Efigênia of the High Cross), organized under Chico Rei, lasted some thirty years and involved the artistic collaboration of the famous mulatto sculptor Antônio Francisco "Aleijadinho" Lisboa.
 Paróquia Nossa Senhora da Conceição - Santa Ifigênia (pt), São Paulo, Brazil, founded in 1809.

Placenames

 Santa Efigênia de Minas, a municipality in the state of Minas Gerais in the Southeast region of Brazil.
 Santa Ifigenia, a town in the Honduran department of Ocotepeque (department).
 Santa Efigenia, a small town located in the Municipality of San Pedro Tapanatepec, in the State of Oaxaca, Mexico.
 Santa Ifigenia Cemetery, in Santiago de Cuba, Cuba. Inaugurated in February 1868.

See also
 Folk saint

Notes

References

Further reading

  José Pereira de Santana. Os dous atlantes da Ethiopia Santo Elesbaõ, emperador XLVII. da Abessina, advogado dos perigos do mar, e Santa Ifigenia, princeza da Nubia, advogada dos incendios dos edificios, ambos carmelitas. Lisboa, A.P. Galram, 1735-38. (WorldCat database).

External links

 St Matthew the Apostle from The Golden Legend
  HISTÓRIA DE SANTA EFIGÊNIA. Cruz Terra Santa. Retrieved: 4 September 2016.

1st-century Christian female saints
Afro–Latin American culture
Black people in art
Black people in European folklore
Carmelite saints
Christian hagiography
Folk saints
Medieval literature
Medieval Portuguese saints